Coleophora manifesta is a moth of the family Coleophoridae. It is found in Mongolia.

References

manifesta
Moths described in 1972
Moths of Asia